Angiostomatidae is a family of parasitic nematodes.

Genera 
Genera in the family Angiostomatidae include:

 Angiostoma Dujardin, 1845
 Aulacnema P. V. Luc, S. E. Spiridonov & M. J. Wilson, 2005 - genus Aulacnema contains only one species:
 Aulacnema monodelphis P. V. Luc, S. E. Spiridonov & M. J. Wilson, 2005 - a parasite of terrestrial molluscs in Vietnam

References 

 
Nematode families